Romance Tour may refer to:
 Romance Tour (Luis Miguel), 1991 tour by Luis Miguel
 The Romance Tour, 2020 tour by Camila Cabello